The following is a list of episodes of the Okidoki Studio cartoon television series The Podcats, which premiered on September 7, 2009. The show aired on France 3, France Ô, TV3 and many more.

Seasons each have 26 episodes, bringing the total to 78 episodes.

Episodes

Season 1: 2009–07

Buzz
Emoticon
Manga
Backup
Bluetooth
Nac
Firewall
Bug
GPS
Bonus
Troll
Ping & lag
Boss
Overclocking
Lightsaber
Playback
Hub
Guitar Hero
Voice off
Sound effects
Tricks
Tank
Camper
Search engine
MP3 Downloads
Super power
Combo
Dragon
The chosen
Cheat code
Grimoire
Old sage
Paladin
Drop
Demo
Levels
Timer
Warpzone
Pilot
Mod
juzzboyking

References

Lists of French animated television series episodes